Petersfield Town Football Club are an English football club based in Petersfield, Hampshire, England. The club is affiliated to the Hampshire Football Association, and is a FA Charter Standard Community Club. They are currently members of the Wessex Football League in Division One. They play their home fixtures at The Southdowns Builders Ltd Stadium.

Also host to local Charity Football team Fundraising FC

History

The club was founded by Peter De-Sisto in 1993 after the demise of Petersfield United (founded 1889). The previous club folded after being denied permission to switch from the Isthmian League to the Wessex League and had serious debts. The newly formed club took their place in the first Division (Now Premier Division) of the Wessex League, under the management of former England player Gary Stevens.

For the first four seasons the club stayed in the Wessex league before being relegated to division one of the Hampshire League. The club only lasted one season in division one and were relegated again to division two, where they stayed for a further season finishing as runners-up however when the league was re-organised they were effectively promoted twice, as they now found themselves in the newly formed Premier division.

The club stayed in the Premier Division of the Hampshire League until the start of the 2004–05 season, when the Wessex League expanded and the club joined the newly formed Division Two. The club remained in this division, which was now called Division One, until the 2013–14 season when Petersfield Town became Wessex League Division One Champions. The 2014–15 then saw the club finish as Wessex League Premier Division champions, becoming the first club to win back to back championships in the Wessex League and thus earned promotion to the Southern Football League. There are two teams that represent Petersfield Town, these being the First Team and the Reserves.

Ground

The club play their home games at The Southdowns Builders Stadium, Love Lane, Petersfield, Hampshire, GU31 4BW. The stadium at Love Lane has hosted Petersfield Town and previously Petersfield United since 1948. 
The stadium has a capacity of 3,000, of which 250 is seated (this was the limit set for a match with Aldershot Town in 1993), with one all-seating stand down one side of the field of play. It has floodlights. The stadium is situated opposite Churcher's College.
In August 2007 the town council expressed concern at the dilapidated state of the ground, describing it as "a magnet for teenage vandals".

Management Team
Head of Football - Mark Summerhill
1st Team Joint Managers - Joe Lea & Pat Suraci
1st Team Goalkeeper Coach - James Bracking
1st Team Analyst - Steve Hook
1st Team Scout - Brandon Fenna
Reserve Team Manager - Mark Howard
Reserve Team Assistant Manager - Aaron Ramsey
Secretary - Mark Nicoll

Notable Managers of Petersfield Town and players that have joined professional clubs include:
Maik Taylor
Gary Stevens Manager 1993 (Brighton, Tottenham, Portsmouth and England International)
Guy Madjo

Honours

League honours
Wessex Football League Premier Division
Champions (1): 2014–15
Wessex Football League Division One
Champions (1): 2013–14
Hampshire League Division Two
Runners-up (1): 1998–99

Cup honours
Wessex League Cup
Runners-up (2): 2014, 2015
Portsmouth Senior Cup
Runners-up (1): 2015
Runners-up 2017

Hampshire Youth Cup Winners1994

Records

FA Cup best performance: Third Qualifying Round 2015–16
FA Trophy best performance: Preliminary Qualifying round 2015–16
FA Vase best performance: Second round 1994–95

References

External links
Official website

Petersfield
Football clubs in Hampshire
Wessex Football League
Association football clubs established in 1993
Football clubs in England
1993 establishments in England
East Hampshire District